Yuri Ivanovich Bavykin (born 31 March 1973) is a Russian professional football coach and a former player. He is an assistant coach with FC Neftekhimik Nizhnekamsk.

Club career
He made his debut in the Russian Premier League in 1992 for PFC CSKA Moscow. He played 1 game in the UEFA Champions League 1992–93 for PFC CSKA Moscow.

From 2005 to 2008, he worked as a referee, reaching Russian Second Division level in 2008.

Honours
 Soviet Cup winner: 1991.
 Soviet Cup finalist: 1992.
 Russian Cup finalist: 1993, 1994.

References

1973 births
People from Belgorod
Living people
Soviet footballers
Soviet Union under-21 international footballers
Russian footballers
Russia under-21 international footballers
Russian football referees
Association football midfielders
Association football defenders
Russian football managers
FC Salyut Belgorod players
PFC CSKA Moscow players
Russian Premier League players
FC Lada-Tolyatti players
FC Lokomotiv Nizhny Novgorod players
PFC Krylia Sovetov Samara players
FC Baltika Kaliningrad players
FC Chernomorets Novorossiysk players
FC Sokol Saratov players
FC Mordovia Saransk players
Sportspeople from Belgorod Oblast
FC Spartak-MZhK Ryazan players